Patrícia Esparteiro (born 24 May 1994) is a Portuguese karateka. She is a two-time bronze medalist in the women's team kata event at the European Karate Championships. She also won bronze in the individual kata event at this competition in 2011.

She also represented Portugal at the 2019 European Games in Minsk, Belarus and she won one of the bronze medals in the women's individual kata event.

Career 

She competed in the women's individual kata event at the 2018 World Karate Championships held in Madrid, Spain.

In 2019, she represented Portugal at the European Games in Minsk, Belarus and she won one of the bronze medals in the women's individual kata event. In 2019, she also competed in the women's individual kata event at the World Beach Games held in Doha, Qatar without winning a medal.

In May 2021, she won one of the bronze medals in the women's team kata event at the European Karate Championships held in Poreč, Croatia. In June 2021, she competed at the World Olympic Qualification Tournament held in Paris, France hoping to qualify for the 2020 Summer Olympics in Tokyo, Japan. In November 2021, she competed in the women's individual kata event at the World Karate Championships held in Dubai, United Arab Emirates.

Achievements

References

External links 
 

Living people
1994 births
Place of birth missing (living people)
Portuguese female karateka
European Games bronze medalists for Portugal
Karateka at the 2019 European Games
European Games medalists in karate
21st-century Portuguese women